Oneida Township is one of the twenty-one townships of Tama County, Iowa, United States.

History
Oneida Township was organized in 1860.

References

Townships in Tama County, Iowa
Townships in Iowa